John Robert Eves (28 February 1922 – 2007) was an English footballer who made 177 appearances in the Football League playing for Darlington in the years following the Second World War. He played as a full back. Eves began his football career with Sunderland, for whom he made numerous appearances in the wartime competitions, including in the 1942 Football League War Cup Final, but never represented them in post-war senior football.

References

1922 births
2007 deaths
Footballers from Sunderland
English footballers
Association football defenders
Sunderland A.F.C. players
Darlington F.C. players
English Football League players